The Canon V-20 was a MSX microcomputer made by the Japanese corporation Canon. It had an innovative digital camera interface (T-90/DMB-90) to use with the Canon T90.

Canon V-10
The V-10 was quite identical to the V-20, except that it had less RAM memory (just 16 KB) and a white case.

Technical specifications

References

External links
 Canon V-20
 V-20 gallery
Canon V-20 

Canon Inc.
MSX
Computer-related introductions in 1983
Products introduced in 1983